Road to the White House is an American television series on the C-SPAN network that periodically follows campaign-related activities of official and potential Democratic, Republican, third party and independent presidential candidates during the quadrennial United States presidential election cycles.

References

External links
Road to the White House, C-SPAN Video Library 

1987 American television series debuts
1980s American television news shows
1990s American television news shows
2000s American television news shows
2010s American television news shows
2020s American television news shows
C-SPAN original programming
English-language television shows
United States presidential campaigns